Zoya Yurievna Buryak (6 November 1966, Krasnoyarsk) is a Soviet and  Russian film and stage actress.

Biography 
Zoya Buriak was born in Krasnoyarsk on 6 November 1966. In 1971 her family moved to Odessa.

In 1985, after graduation, she entered Russian State Institute of Performing Arts for the course of Lev Dodin.

In 1990 she graduated from the institute and was accepted into the troupe of the Youth Theatre on the Fontanka.

Awards
Honored Artist of Russia (2005)

Selected filmography
1988 — The Cold Summer of 1953
1994 — Tsar Ivan the Terrible
1994 — Life and Extraordinary Adventures of Private Ivan Chonkin1995 — Peculiarities of the National Hunt2001 — Mechanical Suite2003 — Lines of Fate2008 — Hitler goes Kaput!2008 — Black Hunters2011 — Burnt by the Sun 2: The Citadel2012 — ''

References

External links

 Зоя Буряк в проекте «ЛЮДИ»

1966 births
Living people
Russian film actresses
Soviet film actresses
Russian stage actresses
Soviet stage actresses
Russian television actresses
20th-century Russian actresses
21st-century Russian actresses
Honored Artists of the Russian Federation
Actors from Krasnoyarsk